Chopise Hopongkyu (born 20 December 2000) is an Indian cricketer. He made his first-class debut on 19 January 2020, for Nagaland in the 2019–20 Ranji Trophy. He made his Twenty20 debut on 17 January 2021, for Nagaland in the 2020–21 Syed Mushtaq Ali Trophy. He made his List A debut on 1 March 2021, for Nagaland in the 2020–21 Vijay Hazare Trophy.

References

External links
 

2000 births
Living people
Indian cricketers
Nagaland cricketers
Place of birth missing (living people)